The Bridgewater State Bears football team represents Bridgewater State University in college football at the NCAA Division III level. The Bears are members of the Massachusetts State Collegiate Athletic Conference (MASCAC), fielding its team in the MASCAC since 2013. The Bears play their home games at Swenson Field in Bridgewater, Massachusetts. 

Their head coach is Joe Verria, who took over the position for the 2016 season.

Conference affiliations
 Mason–Dixon Conference (1960–1974)
 New England Football Conference (1975–2012)
 Massachusetts State Collegiate Athletic Conference (2013–present)

List of head coaches

Key

Coaches

Year-by-year results

See also
 Bridgewater State Bears

Notes

References

External links
 

 
American football teams established in 1960
1960 establishments in Massachusetts